The 2012 Fukuoka International Women's Cup was a professional tennis tournament played on grass courts. It was the twelfth edition of the tournament which was part of the 2012 ITF Women's Circuit. It took place in Fukuoka, Japan, on 7–13 May 2012.

WTA entrants

Seeds 

 1 Rankings as of 30 April 2012

Other entrants 
The following players received wildcards into the singles main draw:
  Miyu Kato
  Makoto Ninomiya
  Risa Ozaki
  Akiko Yonemura

The following players received entry from the qualifying draw:
  Shiho Akita
  Zarina Diyas
  Kazusa Ito
  Sun Shengnan

The following players received entry as lucky losers:
  Ksenia Lykina
  Remi Tezuka

Champions

Singles 

  Casey Dellacqua def.  Monique Adamczak 6–4, 6–1

Doubles 

  Monique Adamczak /  Stephanie Bengson def.  Misa Eguchi /  Akiko Omae 6–4, 6–4

External links 
 ITF Search
 

Fukuoka International Women's Cup
Fukuoka International Women's Cup
2012 in Japanese women's sport
2012 in Japanese tennis